A minuet is a social dance of French origin for two people.

Minuet or Menuet  may also refer to:

Animals
 Minuet (horse) (1812–1833), a British Thoroughbred racehorse and broodmare
 Minuet cat, a hybrid cat breed

Arts and entertainment
 Minuet step, the dance step performed in a minuet
 Minuet (film), a 1982 Belgian-Dutch film
 Minuet, a 1955 novel by Louis Paul Boon
 "Minuet", a song by Idina Menzel from Still I Can't Be Still
 Minuet, a fictional holographic character in the Star Trek: The Next Generation episode "11001001"

Computing
 MenuetOS, an operating system
 Minnesota Internet Users Essential Tool, an Internet suite

See also
 
 Minaret, an architectural feature of Islamic mosques
 Minute (disambiguation)